The American Underslung was an American automobile, the brainchild of Harry Stutz and designer Fred Tone, manufactured in Indianapolis from 1905 to 1914 by American Motor Car Company.

Design 
The American Underslung's chassis design and huge  wheels gave it a distinctive appearance and it was noticeably lower than other cars from the same era. The chassis was hung below the axles rather than set atop them, with the engine and transmission mass moved closer to the ground lowering the center of gravity and giving sports car appearance and handling. The design mounted the engine and body within the frame rails rather than on the top as with other cars of the era. Developed in collaboration with Harry Stutz, the 1905 Underslung "was one of the most significant, if unsung, automobiles of this century's first decade."

The automobiles were marketed at the upper price range of the market. Prices for the American Underslung ranged from US$1,250 to $4,000.

Versions

The American Underslung came in several versions:
 A two door sports version, called the "Scout Roadster".
 Around 1909, American introduced a four-passenger Underslung dubbed "The Traveler." An example of this car, chassis #1687, is on display at the Simeone Foundation Automotive Museum in Philadelphia, PA, USA.
 The car was also available from 1905 to 1908 with a conventional chassis design; this model was called the "American Tourist".  It came in another version, a two door sports version, called the Scout Roadster.

Updates:
 In 1913, electric starters and lights became available on the Underslungs.

Closure 
The American Underslung marketing slogan was "The Car For The Discriminating Few" and apparently there were few buyers. Although new models were introduced for 1914 and the company continued to boast the American Underslung was "America’s Most Luxurious Car", the end came when the firm was put into receivership in November 1913.

References

External links 

Brass Era vehicles
Defunct motor vehicle manufacturers of the United States
Motor vehicle manufacturers based in Indiana
Defunct companies based in Indiana
Defunct companies based in Indianapolis